Grete Jenny (born 27 February 1930) is an Austrian sprinter. She competed in the women's 4 × 100 metres relay at the 1948 Summer Olympics.

References

External links
 

1930 births
Living people
Athletes (track and field) at the 1948 Summer Olympics
Austrian female sprinters
Olympic athletes of Austria
Place of birth missing (living people)
Olympic female sprinters